Leonard Solomon Lerman (June 27, 1925 – September 19, 2012) was an American scientist most noted for his work on DNA.

Life and career
Lerman was born and raised in Pittsburgh, the son of Freamah and Meyer Lerman, Jewish immigrants from Ukraine. His father was a department store buyer. Lerman began attending the Carnegie Institute of Technology before graduating from high school and received his BS in five semesters. As a graduate student with Linus Pauling at the California Institute of Technology, Lerman discovered that antibodies have two binding sites. Later, perhaps his most important discovery was that certain molecules bind to DNA by intercalation. This discovery has shaped much of science's understanding about how drugs and mutagens interact with DNA.

Later, during a sabbatical at the University of Cambridge, Lerman had a chance to work with later Nobel prize winners Sydney Brenner and Francis Crick.

Lerman led a productive research program at Vanderbilt University in Nashville, the University of Colorado Health Sciences Center in Denver and SUNY Albany, the State University of New York at Albany. Lerman's lab crew included at least one Nobel prize winner, Sidney Altman, and another, Tom Maniatis, who also became one of the leading molecular biologists of his time.

Lerman's last major effort, begun with Stuart Fischer at SUNY, was the invention of denaturing gradient gel electrophoresis (DGGE), a technique used to separate DNA molecules. DGGE is widely used by scientists who wish to ascertain biodiversity in microbial communities.

Dr. Lerman was also a senior member of one of the first biotechnology companies, the Genetics Institute, co-founded by one of his students, Tom Maniatis. Dr. Lerman was a member of the National Academy of Sciences, USA.

References

External links
 
Sidney Altman's Nobel Prize Autobiography with a description of the time he spent working with Leonard Lerman in Colorado

1925 births
American molecular biologists
American geneticists
California Institute of Technology alumni
2012 deaths
Members of the United States National Academy of Sciences